Charles Misodi Njapa (born March 5, 1976), better known by his stage name 88-Keys, is an American record producer and rapper from New York City.

Biography
Born in New York City to West African parents from Cameroon, he was raised in the Eastchester section of the Bronx and later in West Hempstead on Long Island, where he attended high school.

88-Keys first took an interest in hip hop after hearing Prince Paul's production on De La Soul's 1989 critically acclaimed album 3 Feet High and Rising. In the early 1990s, 88-Keys met rapper-producers Q-Tip, Pete Rock and Large Professor working as an intern at West Hempstead's The Music Palace recording studio. It was Large Professor who gave Charles his 88-Keys moniker after witnessing his skills on the Ensoniq ASR-10 keyboard.

Upon considering a serious career in music, 88-Keys's parents and older brother began trying to point him into the field of medicine because it was a more "professional field" and the music industry didn't seem like a lucrative move. After briefly attending Hofstra University and Queens College, 88-Keys dropped out to pursue his dreams of being a record producer. His decision was fueled by an opportunity to record some tracks with The Pharcyde who were recording in California. 88-Keys currently resides in Harlem, New York with his wife and two daughters.

In addition to his passion for music, 88-Keys has expressed his love for fashion, most notably Ralph Lauren. During an interview with Metro 88-Keys revealed that he has worn Polo Ralph Lauren every day for 16 years.

According to the article, 88-Keys began wearing Polo Ralph Lauren as a Long Island high school student in 1992 when he developed a liking for its classic, preppy style. Since then, he's worn a complete look from the brand every day, without fail. His wardrobe includes over 700 Polo pieces.

Since his days as an assistant engineer, 88-Keys has produced records for numerous artists including Mos Def, Talib Kweli, Kid Cudi, Macy Gray, Musiq Soulchild, Dejuan Lucian and Consequence. Recently, 88-Keys extended beyond his production credits to highlight his skills on the mic as MC, singer and collaborator, most notably on his solo debut album The Death of Adam released on November 11, 2008. Executively produced by 88-Keys's close friend Kanye West, the concept album tells the story of a man named Adam who has been murdered in a loft apartment in Harlem. In August 2008 a fifteen-track mixtape titled Adam's Case Files was released as a prequel to The Death of Adam. The album's first single titled "Stay Up! (Viagra)" was officially released through iTunes on September 9, 2008. In December 2008, 88-Keys was highlighted as Spin Artist of the Day. In 2009, 88-Keys worked in Atlanta with new female duo Addictive on a track for a forthcoming album.

In June 2019, 88-Keys announced that a song he produced titled "That's Life", featuring Sia and Mac Miller, had been approved for release by Miller's estate, and was released through Warner Records on June 20, 2019.

Discography

 Adam's Case Files Mixtape (2008)
 Stay Up! (Viagra) Prescription Pack – EP (2008)
 The Death of Adam (2008)

References

External links 

 
 

1976 births
Living people
20th-century American rappers
21st-century American rappers
African-American male rappers
African-American record producers
African-American male songwriters
American hip hop record producers
American male rappers
East Coast hip hop musicians
American people of Cameroonian descent
Rappers from the Bronx
Record producers from New York (state)
Songwriters from New York (state)
Underground rappers
20th-century African-American male singers
21st-century African-American male singers